The 2015 Russian Figure Skating Championships was held from 24 to 28 December 2014 in Sochi. Medals were awarded in the disciplines of men's singles, ladies' singles, pair skating, and ice dancing. The results were among the criteria used to select Russia's teams sent to the 2015 World Championships and 2015 European Championships.

Competitions

Medalists of most important competitions

Senior Championships
The senior Championships was held in Sochi for the third year in a row. Competitors qualified through international success or by competing in the Russian Cup series' senior-level events. 2014 national champions Adelina Sotnikova and Ekaterina Bobrova / Dmitri Soloviev were absent from the entry list, which featured 18 men, 18 ladies, 11 pairs, and 10 dance teams.

Schedule
 Thursday, December 25
 14:00–16:30 Men's short
 16:45–17:30 Opening ceremony
 17:45–19:45 Pairs' short
 20:00–21:30 Short dance
 Friday, December 26
 14:00–16:30 Ladies' short
 16:45–19:45 Men's free
 20:00–21:45 Free dance
 Saturday, December 27
 15:00–17:15 Pairs' free
 17:30–20:20 Ladies' free
 Sunday, December 28
 13:00–13:45 Medal ceremonies
 14:00–16:30 Exhibitions

Results

Men

Ladies

Pairs

Ice dancing

Junior Championships
The 2015 Russian Junior Championships were held in Yoshkar-Ola from 4 to 7 February 2015. Competitors qualified by competing in the Russian Cup series' junior-level events. There were 18 qualifiers in the men's event, 18 ladies, 12 pairs, and 15 ice dancing teams. The results of the February competition was part of the selection criteria for the 2015 World Junior Championships.

Results

Men

Ladies

Pairs

Ice dancing

International team selections

Winter Universiade
The team for the 2015 Winter Universiade was announced as follows:

European Championships
The team for the 2015 European Championships was announced on 28 December 2014:

World Junior Championships
The team for the 2015 World Junior Championships was announced on 12 February 2015 in no particular order:

World Championships
The team for the 2015 World Championships was announced as follows:

References

External links
 2015 Russian Championships at the Russian Figure Skating Federation
 Senior results
 Junior results

Russian Figure Skating Championships
Russian Championships
Russian Championships
Figure Skating Championships
Figure Skating Championships